Tally-ho is the traditional cry made by the huntsman to tell others the quarry has been sighted. It may also be used with directions, including "away" and "back".

First used in fox-hunting, it was adapted in the 19th century to describe some horse-drawn vehicles and in the 20th century to advise of enemy aircraft and space junk.

Etymology
Tally-ho dates from around 1772, and is probably derived from the French taïaut, a cry used to excite hounds when hunting deer.

Taïaut may have originated in the second half of the 13th century by the concatenation of a two-word war-cry: taille haut. "Taille" is the cutting edge of a sword and "haut" means high or 'raised up'. So the original meaning  might be something close to "Swords up!".

Usage

Fox-hunting
The cry was made by the huntsman on catching sight of the fox to alert other members of the hunt. It has been used in similar circumstances for quite different quarries:

RAF
It was used by RAF fighter pilots in the Second World War to tell their controller they were about to engage enemy aircraft.

It was also used to announce to the squadron leader (or other person of command in the flight) the spotting of an enemy aircraft.

Royal Navy

The British T-class submarine HMS Tally-Ho was named after the hunting cry. It is the only vessel to bear the name. It was launched in 1942 and scrapped in 1967.

NASA
"Tally-ho" is also used by NASA astronauts in audio transmissions to signify sightings of other spacecraft, space stations, and unidentified objects.

Horse-drawn vehicles
The coach was operated by Sarah Mountain. Other fast coaches began to use the same name and it became a common description of a fast coach.

United States

In the United States, "tally-ho" can describe a large coach or a light passenger vehicle without roof or sides used for sight-seeing.

References

English phrases
Hunting with hounds
Fox hunting
Royal Air Force